Protonarthron is a genus of longhorn beetles of the subfamily Lamiinae, containing the following species:

 Protonarthron diabolicum Thomson, 1858
 Protonarthron dubium Hintz, 1911
 Protonarthron fasciatum Breuning, 1936
 Protonarthron gracile Breuning, 1936
 Protonarthron indistinctum Breuning, 1938
 Protonarthron microps Jordan, 1903
 Protonarthron olympianum Aurivillius, 1913
 Protonarthron subfasciatum Jordan, 1894

References

Protonarthrini